The 2013 season of the Tonga Major League was the 34th season of top flight association football competition in Tonga. Lotohaʻapai United won the championship for the fourteenth time, and their third consecutive title.

Teams 
 Lotohaʻapai United
 Haʻamoko United Youth
 Marist Prems
 Popua

Standings

Rounds

Round 1

Round 2

Round 3

Round 4 

The remaining two rounds were cancelled and Lotoha'apai were declared champions.

References

Tonga Major League seasons
Tonga
Football